is an ethnic Ryukyuan, and the current head of the Shō family, the former Ryūkyūan royal family.

Life
Mamoru Shō was born in Tokyo on 18 August 1950, the eldest son of Hiroshi Shō. After graduating from Tamagawa University, he obtained an MBA from Samford University.

He is the great-great-grandson of Shō Tai, the last king of the Ryukyu Kingdom, and became the Shō Family Head upon the death of his father on 30 August 1996. In May 2019, he established the Ryukyu History and Culture Inheritance Promotion Association and serves as its representative director. He has also donated a number of family documents and artefacts to Naha City for preservation.

Family
Shō has three daughters and a son named Takeshi, who is the heir apparent to the Shō family. He lives in Ise City, Mie Prefecture.

Ancestry

References

Second Shō dynasty
1950 births
Living people
Tamagawa University alumni
Pretenders